is a Japanese footballer. He is a midfielder.

Career
He was educated at and played for Setouchi High School & Kochi University before signing for J2 club, Mito HollyHock.  In 2016, he signed for Albirex Niigata FC (Singapore) from the S.League on loan for 1 season. He returned to Kochi to play for Kochi United SC for the 2019 season.

Club career statistics
As of 22 February 2018.

References

External links

Profile at Mito HollyHock

1994 births
Living people
Japanese footballers
Association football people from Hiroshima Prefecture
Singapore Premier League players
Albirex Niigata Singapore FC players
J2 League players
Mito HollyHock players
Association football forwards
Kochi University alumni